Georgi Abadzhiev (born 1892, date of death unknown) was a Bulgarian cyclist. He competed in two events at the 1924 Summer Olympics.

References

External links
 

1892 births
Year of death missing
Bulgarian male cyclists
Olympic cyclists of Bulgaria
Cyclists at the 1924 Summer Olympics
Place of birth missing